Bruce Huntley Kekwick (24 April 1910 – 2 February 1982) was an Australian politician who represented the Tasmanian federal electorate of Bass in the House of Representatives from 1949 to 1954.

Born in South Australia, he was educated at state schools in Adelaide before becoming a company director. Having moved to Tasmania, he was an insurance executive before serving as an officer in the Royal Australian Navy from 1940 to 1946. In 1949, he was elected to the House of Representatives as the Liberal member for Bass, defeating Labor minister Claude Barnard. He held the seat until 1954, when he was defeated by Claude Barnard's son Lance Barnard. He became a company director and music executive. He died in 1982.

References

Liberal Party of Australia members of the Parliament of Australia
Members of the Australian House of Representatives for Bass
Members of the Australian House of Representatives
1910 births
1982 deaths
20th-century Australian politicians
Royal Australian Navy personnel of World War II
Royal Australian Navy officers